The Diocese of Kalamazoo is a Latin Church ecclesiastical territory, or diocese, of the Catholic Church in the southwestern portion of the State of Michigan in the United States.  It is a suffragan diocese in the ecclesiastical province of the metropolitan Archdiocese of Detroit.

Territory 
The Diocese of Kalamazoo encompasses Allegan, Van Buren, Berrien, Cass, Saint Joseph, Kalamazoo, Branch, Calhoun, and Barry Counties.

History

1700 to 1970 
During the 17th century, present-day Michigan was part of the French colony of New France. The Diocese of Quebec had jurisdiction over the region. In 1763, the Michigan area became part of the British Province of Quebec, forbidden from settlement by American colonists. After the American Revolution, the Michigan region became part of the new United States. For Catholics, Michigan was now under the jurisdiction of the Archdiocese of Baltimore, which then comprised the entire country.

In 1808, Pope Pius VII erected the Diocese of Bardstown in Kentucky, with jurisdiction over the new Michigan Territory. On June 19, 1821, the pope erected the Diocese of Cincinnati, taking the Michigan Territory from the Diocese of Bardstown.

Pope Gregory XVI formed the Diocese of Detroit on March 8, 1833, covering the entire Michigan Territory. Pope Leo XIII erected the Diocese of Grand Rapids out of the Archdiocese of Detroit on May 19, 1882, including the Kalamazoo area.

1970 to present 
On December 19, 1970, the Diocese of Kalamazoo was erected by Pope Paul VI and the parish of St. Augustine designated as its cathedral  The diocese was officially inaugurated on July 21, 1971, when Reverend Paul Donovan of the Diocese of Lansing was consecrated and installed as the first bishop.  From 1914 until its closure in 1992 the diocese hosted Nazareth College. Donovan resigned as bishop in 1994 after 23 years as bishop of Kalamazoo.

In 1994, Pope John Paul II appointed Auxiliary Bishop Alfred Markiewicz from the Diocese of Rockville Centre as the second bishop of Kalamazoo. He died in 1997 after only three years in office. That same year, John Paul II named Reverend James Murray of the Diocese of Lansing to replace Markiewicz. in 2006. Murray released the “Diocesan Pastoral Plan for Hispanic Latino Ministry.” He also established the diocese Trauma Recovery Program for victims of childhood trauma. Murray retired in 2009.

The current bishop of Kalamazoo is Paul J. Bradley, a former auxiliary bishop of the Diocese of Pittsburgh.  He was appointed by Pope Benedict XVI in 2009/

Sexual abuse 
In January 2019, Bishop Bradley assigned Archbishop Emeritus John Nienstedt, of the Archdiocese of St. Paul and Minneapolis, to assist for several months at a parish in Battle Creek, Michigan.  Many parishioners did not want Nienstadt due to his failure to report sexual abuse claims as archbishop.  After two weeks, Nienstadt left the parish in Battle Creek.

In February 2020, the diocese announced that an individual was claiming that Reverend  Richard Fritz, a retired diocesan priest, had sexually abused them during the late 1970's and early 1980's.

Statistics 
The Diocese of Kalamazoo consists of 46 parishes and 13 missions,  with 75 priests, and 36 deacons. The diocese operates three high schools, two middle schools and 17 grade schools, serving more than 3,000 students. The diocese also has two parish-run preschools.

Bishops of Kalamazoo

 Paul Vincent Donovan (1971–1994)
 Alfred John Markiewicz (1995–1997)
 James Albert Murray (1998–2009)
 Paul J. Bradley (2009–present)

Coat of arms

The arms are displayed on a red field to represent the Native Americans of the Diocese of Kalamazoo. This field contains a silver (white) wavy bend (a bar that runs from upper left to lower right), which is the heraldic representation of water. This bend is strewn with a seme (a scattering of no specific number) of blue annulets to represent bubbles. The bend represents the Native American name Kalamazoo, which means "boiling pot." It describes the bubbles on the Kalamazoo River.

Below the bend is a silver Native American peace pipe, decorated with gold feathers, which was called a "calumet" by the French explorers in the region.

Above the bend is an open book (silver, edged in gold) that displays in red the Latin words Tolle Lege. This quote comes from an account by Augustine of Hippo, titular saint of the Kalamazoo cathedral, from when he was a young man. Augustine said he was meditating on the bible under a tree when he heard a small child say "Take and Read" (Tolle Lege). Opening to the Epistle to the Romans, Augustine read  "let us live honorably as in the day, not in reveling and drunkenness, not in debauchery and licentiousness, not in quarreling and jealousy. Instead, put on the Lord Jesus Christ, and make no provision for the flesh, to gratify its desires." (Rom. 13:13). Believing he heard the voice of God, Augustine entered the Christian religious profession, eventually becoming the Bishop of Hippo in North Africa.

Churches

Schools

See also

 Catholic Church by country
 Catholic Church hierarchy
 List of the Catholic dioceses of the United States

References

External links
Roman Catholic Diocese Of Kalamazoo Official Site

 
Kalamazoo
Kalamazoo
Kalamazoo, Michigan
Christian organizations established in 1970
Kalamazoo